Turners Hill Transmitter refers to a pair of free-standing radio and television towers on Turners Hill, on the border of Dudley and Rowley Regis in the Metropolitan Borough of Sandwell, both localities being in the West Midlands of England.

One is a made from lattice steel, the other, "Turners Hill 2" with a height of 60.96 metres (200 ft), is made of concrete, topped by a steel antenna.

They carry multiplexes 11B, 11C, 11D and 12B.

It also broadcasts Free Radio Black Country & Shropshire on 97.2 FM.

A local landmark, the masts are visible from the nearby M5 motorway and M6 motorway,  and from as far afield as Barr Beacon.

References 

Radio masts and towers in Europe
Buildings and structures in the West Midlands (county)
Rowley Regis